Connagh is a rural townland of the village of Ballineen, County Cork, Ireland. The total population in 2011 for this townland was 28, of which males numbered 14 and females numbered 14. The total housing stock was 12, of which vacant households numbered 1.

The townland previously hosted the location for the national school serving Connagh and neighbouring townlands.

Archaeology
Archaeological sites include a ringfort and souterrain.

See also 
 List of townlands of the Barony of East Carbery (West_Division)

References 

Townlands of County Cork